Royce Brook (sometimes referred to as Royces Brook, Royces Branch, or Royce Brook River) is a tributary of the Millstone River in Hillsborough and Manville, New Jersey in the United States.

Path
Royce Brook does not have a definite starting point, as it consists of several bodies of water flowing into it within its  watershed.

Name
The origins of the creek's name is unknown, but there is a street that runs parallel to it in Hillsborough called, "Royce Brook Road." Also, there is a local golf club called, "The Royce Brook Golf Club."

One of the earliest settlers of Hillsborough (other than Lenape) was a man named John Royce. It is documented that during the late 17th century he owned a large piece of land. This land is pretty much what is now the entire town of Manville.

Flooding
As with the Millstone River, the Royce Brook can flood to extreme heights. The power of Hurricane Floyd was such that it literally changed the landscape surrounding the creek and deposited much sediment into the lands surrounding it. The majority of rainstorms with enough water erode the riverbed and deposit debris and pollution into the river.

Pollution
Royce Brook was tested for pollutants during rainstorms in July and October 2006. Tests included dissolved oxygen (DO), nitrate, phosphate, total dissolved solids, electroconductivity, temperature, and pH. It was found to have low dissolved oxygen levels and very high phosphate levels. The researcher of this project suggests that such contamination is from farms or lawns upstream which could be using soils with pesticides on them (which contain phosphates), and the phosphates will flow into Royce Brook during a rainstorm was runoff. High levels of phosphates have been documented as encouraging too many aquatic plants to grow, using dissolved oxygen from the water (limiting it to the fish), which could be the situation in Royce Brook. Additional evidence of high phosphate levels is that the pH of Royce Brook consistently tested as basic, and fertilizers tend to be basic. Also, water flowing over large stones in Royce Brook usually results in large bubbles on the surface of the water, which is usually regarded as a result of high phosphate levels.

An earlier research project was conducted in the late summer of 2004, at the same location of where the 2006 testing occurred. It tested for some of the same factors (e.g. DO, nitrate, phosphate, and pH) as the 2006 test; but was not tested during a rainstorm. There were similar results: dissolved oxygen levels were low, phosphate levels were high, and pH levels were basic (even though the pH tested as normal).

A high level of pollution exists in Royce  Brook, especially rusting iron, soda cans, plastic bottles, and plastic bags which was documented in the research project of the summer 2006.

Roads and railroads
A series of roads and railroads cross over Royce Brook.

In Hillsborough
 U.S. Route 206
 Amwell Road
 Hamilton Road
 Falcon Road
 Sunnymead Road
 Central New York Railroad

In Manville
 Whalen Street
 South Main Street

Sister tributaries
Beden Brook
Bear Brook
Cranbury Brook
Devils Brook
Shallow Brook
Harrys Brook
Heathcote Brook
Indian Run Brook
Little Bear Brook
Millstone Brook
Peace Brook
Rocky Brook
Simonson Brook
Six Mile Run
Stony Brook
Ten Mile Run
Van Horn Brook

Notes
1. ^ http://www.sbmwa.org/ws_assess_lvl2.php?id=C0_179_50

See also
List of rivers of New Jersey

References

 "Royce Brook Watershed." Stony Brook Millstone Watershed Association. 9 February 2006 . 9 Apr 2007 <http://www.sbmwa.org/ws_assess_lvl2.php?id=C0_179_50>.
 (2007). Purification of Stormwater Through Use of a Detention Basin and Riprap. Somerset, New Jersey.

External links
USGS Coordinates in Google Maps

Tributaries of the Raritan River
Rivers of New Jersey
Rivers of Somerset County, New Jersey